Grittar (1973 - 1998) was a British-bred Thoroughbred racehorse who competed in National Hunt racing.

In 1982 he won the Grand National as the 7/1 favourite being ridden by amateur jockey Dick Saunders, who at the age of 48 became, and remains, the oldest jockey to have won the Grand National.

Background
Grittar was a bay gelding bred in the United Kingdom by Frank H Gilman. He was owned and trained by Gilman and resided in Rutland.

Racing career

In 1981 Grittar won the Cheltenham and Liverpool Foxhunters and Gilman decided he should be entered in the National the following year.

In preparation for the National, he won at a canter at Leicester before finishing a creditable sixth in the Cheltenham Gold Cup.

Grittar was installed as a 7/1 favourite on the day of the 1982 Grand National race, due mostly to the Foxhunter Chase double in 1981. The victory at Liverpool was enough for him to get the support of BBC Radio Two commentator, Peter Bromley though several newspaper pundits expressed concern at the horse being a hunter chaser. Forty-eight-year-old amateur rider Dick Saunders told trainer Frank Gilman to employ the services of a professional rider, Peter Scudamore for the big race, but Gilman insisted Saunders take the ride if fit. His age and amateur status did little to deter the betting public although leading professional gambler, Alex Bird commented "I immediately pencilled him in for the '82 National, but I'm not happy about the jockey - I'll be keeping my money in my pocket."

Grittar had a virtually trouble free run beating the other 7 finishers by 15 lengths with Saunders retiring immediately after the race and becoming chairman of the Aintree stewards.

Grittar ran in two more Nationals. In 1983 he finished 5th behind Corbiere and the following year ridden by John Francome he finished 10th to Hallo Dandy.

Grittar died aged 25 in Leicestershire.

Grand National record

Pedigree

References

1973 racehorse births
Racehorses bred in the United Kingdom
Racehorses trained in the United Kingdom
Grand National winners
1998 racehorse deaths
Sport in Rutland